An organ stop can mean one of three things:

the control on an organ console that selects a particular sound
the row of organ pipes used to create a particular sound, more appropriately known as a rank
the sound itself

Organ stops are sorted into four major types: principal, string, reed, and flute.

This is a sortable list of names that may be found associated with electronic and pipe organ stops. Countless stops have been designed over the centuries, and individual organs may have stops, or names of stops, used nowhere else. This non-comprehensive list deals mainly with names of stops found on numerous Baroque, classical and romantic organs. Here are a few of the most common ones:

References

External links

 a French organ builder's site in sometimes puzzling English.

Music-related lists
Musical terminology